Navid Negahban (born June 2, 1968) is an Iranian-American actor. He has appeared on 24, Homeland, Mistresses and as Amahl Farouk / Shadow King in the second and third seasons of FX's Legion. He has also starred as The Sultan in the live-action remake of Aladdin.

Early life
Negahban was born in Mashhad, Iran. He took a liking to the theater when he was eight years old, while provoking laughter from a large audience by portraying an old man on stage. He left Iran in 1985 when he was 17 for Turkey and then Germany, where he spent eight years. In Germany, he worked for a theater company, and then in 1993 he moved to the United States. He is fluent in English, German and Persian. He also began learning French for his role on Legion.

Career 
He has appeared in The Shield, The West Wing, Lost, and CSI: Miami. He has collaborated twice with Iranian-American actress Necar Zadegan, once in 24, where her on-screen husband ordered his interrogation and the torturing of his family, and also in CSI: Miami, where, as his wife, she killed him.

Negahban also had two collaborations with another Iranian-American actress, Mozhan Marnò, in the TV series The Unit and the movie The Stoning of Soraya M., where he plays the husband of Soraya (Marnò). In 2008, Negahban voiced and provided his likeness to the character Dr. Challus Mercer in the survival horror game Dead Space. Negahban also appeared as terrorist mastermind Abu Nazir in the critically acclaimed TV series Homeland. In 2011 he won the Best Actor Award for the 2009 Iranian short film, Liberation at the Noor Iranian Film Festival, and in 2012, he returned to serve as an official festival judge.

In February 2015, The Hollywood Reporter and Variety confirmed that Negahban had begun shooting the spy thriller, Damascus Cover, based on the novel by Howard Kaplan, alongside Jonathan Rhys Meyers, Olivia Thirlby and John Hurt. Negahban played the role of Syrian General Sarraj. Negahban appeared as General Abdul Rashid Dostum in the 2018 war drama, 12 Strong, and also starred as the Sultan in the 2019 live-action adaptation of Aladdin. In 2022, he appears in the American crime drama television series The Cleaning Lady as Hayak Barsamian, an Armenian Mob Boss.

Filmography

References

External links

1968 births
Living people
American male film actors
American male television actors
Iranian male film actors
Iranian male television actors
People from Mashhad
20th-century American male actors
21st-century American male actors
Iranian emigrants to Turkey
Iranian emigrants to the United States
Iranian emigrants to Germany
Exiles of the Iranian Revolution in Germany
Exiles of the Iranian Revolution in the United States